William Denton (8 January 1823 - 26 August 1883) was a self-taught geologist, preacher, and a promoter of occult practices such as psychometry. He claimed that inanimate objects had souls or memories which sensitive people like his wife, Elizabeth, and others could "read". He gave lectures on a wide range of topics and while returning from a tour of Australia, he died of fever at Papua New Guinea.

Life and work 

Denton was born at Darlington, Durham. He was educated by his mother's friend Nelly Sedgwick who ran a small school before going to the British Penny School in Darlington. He began to read books from the age of four and at the age of eight he could recite chapters of the Bible from memory. A Baptist teacher named William Shotton made a special impression on him, with demonstration of a home-made galvanic cell. At the age of fourteen he received workshop skills as an apprentice to Timothy Hackworth the pioneering railway and marine engineer at his Soho Works in Shildon. He was a member of the New Shildon Mechanics Institute. Around the same time, he began to read Lyell's geology and went to examine fossils in the workings of the Prince of Wales Tunnel, then being dug to allow a railway to pass beneath the market town of Shildon. When Hackworth asked his apprentice to repair equipment at a brewery, Denton refused claiming that it was against his conscience resulting in his sacking. He then joined the Normal School, while also lecturing on temperance and preaching in London. He began to take an interest in mesmerism and an interest in radical unitarianism. This led to dismissal from his school for heresy. He was then helped by his sister Annie Denton Cridge who ran a school. He later became an assistant at a school in London but lost the position after clashing with its Calvinist principal. He then became a clerk in the South Eastern Railroad Company. He gave lectures that drew crowds much to the ire of the church ministers. In 1848 he emigrated to Philadelphia. He married Caroline Gilbert in 1849 and settled at Dayton where he began to give lectures. His wife died the next year. He then moved to Cincinnati where he began to write for "The Type of the Times" and the printing department there had a compositor named Elizabeth Melissa Foote whom he later married. Around this time, Denton began to read the work of Joseph Rodes Buchanan. Buchanan wrote on mesmerism, spiritualism, and the idea of psychometry ("measuring the soul"). Denton claimed that his wife Elizabeth was a "psychometer". He also claimed that his sister Anna could describe the physical characteristics of a writer of a letter by holding the letter in his hand. He then claimed that this skill was latent in everyone and could be developed. He began to claim application to geology, claiming that he could see the past by holding geological specimens. For instance, he could hold a piece of lava from Hawaii and claimed that he could see "the ocean and ships are sailing on it. This must be an island, for water is all around. Now I am turned from where I saw the vessels, and am looking at something most terrific. It seems as if an ocean of fire were pouring over a precipice, and boiling as it pours. The sight permeates my whole being, and inspires me with terror. I see it flow into the ocean and the water boils intensely." In 1881 he began a tour of the United States and Australia, accompanied by two of his sons including Sherman Foote Denton who made an extensive collection of natural history specimens along the route. On the way back, he went up a mountain in Papua New Guinea and died from a fever. The locals buried him in a town called Berrigabadi.

References

External links 
 The soul of things : or, psychometric researches and discoveries (1871)
 Radical Discourses on Religious Subjects: Delivered in Music Hall, Boston, Mass. (1872)
 Is Darwin Right? (1881)

1823 births
1883 deaths
Occultists